Hershel E. Burgess was a college football player. He was a prominent running back for the Texas A&M Aggies, a star on the national champion 1927 team. He was inducted into the Texas A&M Athletic Hall of Fame in 1975. There is a physics chair at Texas A&M named in his honor, the Hershel E. Burgess '29 Chair in Physics.

References

External links
 

Texas A&M Aggies football players
All-Southern college football players
American football fullbacks